Elwood is a village and the county seat of Gosper County, Nebraska, United States. It is part of the Lexington, Nebraska Micropolitan Statistical Area. The population was 707 at the 2010 census.

History
Elwood was platted in 1885 when the Chicago, Burlington and Quincy Railroad was extended to that point. It was named for Elwood Thomas, a homesteader.

The Gosper County Courthouse in Elwood is on the National Register of Historic Places. The Art Deco building was designed by the Kearney architectural firm of McClure & Walker.

Geography
Elwood is located at  (40.588632, -99.860603).

Elwood is located at the junction of Nebraska Highway 23 and U.S. Route 283, and is south of Elwood Reservoir.  In Elwood, the two highways respectively follow Ripley Street and Smith Street.

Demographics

2010 census
As of the census of 2010, there were 707 people, 282 households, and 183 families residing in the village. The racial makeup of the village was 95.0% White, 0.7% African American, 0.1% Native American, 2.3% from other races, and 1.8% from two or more races. Hispanic or Latino of any race were 3.7% of the population.

There were 282 households, of which 29.1% had children under the age of 18 living with them, 55.0% were married couples living together, 7.1% had a female householder with no husband present, 2.8% had a male householder with no wife present, and 35.1% were non-families. 32.3% of all households were made up of individuals, and 17.8% had someone living alone who was 65 years of age or older. The average household size was 2.37 and the average family size was 2.98.

The median age in the village was 46.4 years. 24.6% of residents were under 18; 4.2% were between 18 and 24; 19.7% were from 25 to 44; 25.7% were from 45 to 64, and 25.7% were 65 years of age or older. The gender makeup of the village was 46.7% male and 53.3% female.

2000 census
As of the census of 2000, there were 761 people, 294 households, and 207 families residing in the village. The population density was 1,561.9 people per square mile (599.6/km2). There were 319 housing units at an average density of 654.7 per square mile (251.4/km2). The racial makeup of the village was 98.03% White, 0.13% Native American, 0.92% from other races, and 0.92% from two or more races. Hispanic or Latino of any race were 2.76% of the population.

There were 294 households, out of which 29.9% had children under the age of 18 living with them, 62.6% were married couples living together, 5.8% had a female householder with no husband present, and 29.3% were non-families. 28.6% of all households were made up of individuals, and 15.6% had someone living alone who was 65 years of age or older. The average household size was 2.41 and the average family size was 2.94.

In the village, the population was spread out, with 25.0% under the age of 18, 5.3% from 18 to 24, 23.9% from 25 to 44, 19.1% from 45 to 64, and 26.8% who were 65 years of age or older. The median age was 42 years. For every 100 females, there were 92.7 males. For every 100 females age 18 and over, there were 86.6 males.

As of 2000 the median income for a household in the village was $36,500, and the median income for a family was $42,917. Males had a median income of $30,809 versus $22,778 for females. The per capita income for the village was $18,042. About 0.5% of families and 3.9% of the population were below the poverty line, including 3.0% of those under age 18 and 6.3% of those age 65 or over.

Schools
Elwood Public Schools educates students from Preschool through twelfth grade.  The school mascot is the Elwood Pirates.  Elwood participates in the Fort Kearney Conference.

References

External links

 Elwood Chamber of Commerce

Villages in Gosper County, Nebraska
Villages in Nebraska
County seats in Nebraska
Lexington Micropolitan Statistical Area